is a train station in the town of Kamiichi, Nakaniikawa District, Toyama Prefecture, Japan.

Lines

Station layout 
The station has one ground-level side platform serving a single bi-directional track. The station is unattended.

History
It was renamed to its present name on 1 October 1936, and was closed on 18 May 1944. It was relocated to its present location and reopened as Ainoki Station on 15 April 1949.

Adjacent stations

Surrounding area 
Hokuriku Expressway

See also
 List of railway stations in Japan

External links

 

Railway stations in Toyama Prefecture
Railway stations in Japan opened in 1931
Stations of Toyama Chihō Railway
Kamiichi, Toyama